Hyparrhenia is a genus of grasses. Many species are known commonly as thatching grass.

They are mostly native to tropical Africa; some can be found in warmer areas in temperate Eurasia, Australia, and Latin America. These are annual and perennial bunch grasses. The inflorescence branches into twin spikes of paired spikelets.

 Species
 Hyparrhenia anamesa - dry Africa from Ethiopia to Cape Province 
 Hyparrhenia andongensis - Angola 
 Hyparrhenia anemopaegma - Zambia 
 Hyparrhenia anthistirioides  - dry Africa from Eritrea to Malawi 
 Hyparrhenia arrhenobasis - Ethiopia  
 Hyparrhenia bagirmica - West Africa 
 Hyparrhenia barteri - from Burkina Faso to Malawi 
 Hyparrhenia bracteata - Africa (from Mali to Zimbabwe), Thailand, Vietnam, New Guinea, Latin America (from Veracruz to Paraná) 
 Hyparrhenia claytonii - Ethiopia  
 Hyparrhenia coleotricha - Eritrea, Ethiopia, Sudan, Tanzania, Yemen 
 Hyparrhenia collina - dry Africa from Nigeria to Ethiopia to KwaZulu-Natal 
 Hyparrhenia confinis  - tropical Africa from Zaïre to Ethiopia 
 Hyparrhenia coriacea - Central African Rep 
 Hyparrhenia cyanescens from Gambia to Zaïre  
 Hyparrhenia cymbaria - Africa, Madagascar, Comoros, India 
 Hyparrhenia dichroa - from Djibouti to KwaZulu-Natal 
 Hyparrhenia diplandra - tropical Africa, southern China, Thailand, Vietnam, Sulawesi 
 Hyparrhenia dregeana - from Yemen and Eritrea to Eswatini
 Hyparrhenia dybowskii - Zaïre, Central African Rep 
 Hyparrhenia exarmata - from Mali to Kenya 
 Hyparrhenia familiaris - from Guinea to Angola 
 Hyparrhenia figariana - from Nigeria to Tanzania 
 Hyparrhenia filipendula - from Guinea to KwaZulu-Natal; Madagascar, Yunnan, Sri Lanka, Philippines, New Guinea, Queensland, New South Wales 
 Hyparrhenia finitima - from Sierra Leone to Mpumalanga 
 Hyparrhenia formosa - from Ethiopia + Yemen to Malawi 
 Hyparrhenia gazensis - from Uganda to KwaZulu-Natal 
 Hyparrhenia glabriuscula  - tropical Africa 
 Hyparrhenia gossweileri - Zaïre, Tanzania, Angola, Zambia 
 Hyparrhenia griffithii - Sudan, Kenya, Tanzania, Zambia, Madagascar, Yunnan, Assam, Myanmar, Vietnam 
 Hyparrhenia hirta - Africa, southern Europe, southwest Asia from France to Cape Province to Pakistan; naturalized in scattered sites in Australia, North + South America 
 Hyparrhenia involucrata - from Burkina Faso to Congo Rep 
 Hyparrhenia madaropoda - from South Sudan to Mozambique 
 Hyparrhenia mobukensis - from Ethiopia to Malawi 
 Hyparrhenia multiplex - Ethiopia + Sudan 
 Hyparrhenia neglecta - Ethiopia  
 Hyparrhenia newtonii - Africa (from Guinea to Eswatini), Madagascar, China, Southeast Asia, New Guinea
 Hyparrhenia niariensis - from Cameroon to Zambia 
 Hyparrhenia nyassae - tropical Africa, Madagascar, Thailand, Vietnam 
 Hyparrhenia papillipes - Ethiopia, Kenya, Uganda, Yemen, Tanzania, Madagascar 
 Hyparrhenia pilgeriana - from Ethiopia to KwaZulu-Natal 
 Hyparrhenia pilosa - Central African Rep 
 Hyparrhenia poecilotricha - from Guinea to KwaZulu-Natal 
 Hyparrhenia praetermissa - Sulawesi 
 Hyparrhenia quarrei - from Yemen to Nigeria + KwaZulu-Natal 
 Hyparrhenia rudis - tropical Africa, Madagascar 
 Hyparrhenia rufa - tropical - southern Africa; Yunnan, Myanmar, Thailand; naturalized in Florida, Texas, Latin America (from Chihuahua to Paraguay); various islands in Caribbean, Pacific, Indian Ocean 
 Hyparrhenia schimperi - from Ethiopia to Cape Province; Madagascar 
 Hyparrhenia smithiana - from Guinea to Congo Rep 
 Hyparrhenia subplumosa - from Guinea to Zimbabwe 
 Hyparrhenia tamba - from Eritrea to Lesotho 
 Hyparrhenia tuberculata - Ethiopia 
 Hyparrhenia umbrosa - from Nigeria to KwaZulu-Natal; Comoros 
 Hyparrhenia variabilis - from Yemen + Eritrea to KwaZulu-Natal; Comoros, Madagascar 
 Hyparrhenia violascens - Burkina Faso, Nigeria, Chad, Cameroon 
 Hyparrhenia welwitschii - from Guinea to Zimbabwe; Comoros 
 Hyparrhenia wombaliensis - Cameroon, Congo Rep, Zaïre

 formerly included
see Andropogon Elymandra Exotheca Hyperthelia Parahyparrhenia

References

External links
 Jepson Manual Treatment
 Grass Manual Treatment
 USDA Plants: North American Species
 Photo: Double Spikes

Andropogoneae
Poaceae genera